USS Klakring (FFG-42), an Oliver Hazard Perry class frigate, was a ship of the United States Navy named for Rear Admiral Thomas B. Klakring (1904–1975), who was awarded three Navy Crosses as commander of the submarine  during World War II.

Construction and commissioning
Klakring was laid down on 19 February 1982 by the Bath Iron Works Corp. Bath, Maine; launched on 18 September 1982; sponsored by Beverly Bohen, niece of Rear Admiral Klakring; and commissioned on 20 August 1983 at Bath.

Service history

1980s

1983
Klakring completed a light-off examination on 8 September 1983, followed on 15 September by her initial crew certification. Prior to leaving for Charleston, South Carolina, Klakring visited Newport, Rhode Island. The Klakring crew was able to explore Newport while the America's Cup battle was underway. Many sailors experienced getting their "land legs" back after their first days at sea. The ship reached her initial home port of Charleston, South Carolina, on 18 September. Family members and friends on the pier displayed homemade banners while they welcomed the ship as she maneuvered up the Cooper River on 28 September.

The ship sailed for her shakedown cruise to Caribbean waters. She visited St. Thomas, Virgin Islands (4–7 November 1983), and on 13 November put into Guantánamo Bay, Cuba. Klakring sailed on 3 December, carried out a weapons systems accuracy test at Port Everglades, Florida, and then test-fired torpedoes on the range at Atlantic Undersea Test and Evaluation Center (AUTEC), St. Andros Island, on 13 December. She returned to Charleston on 16 December.

1984
Klakring carried out additional training during the New Year 1984, including a visit to Nassau, Bahamas (27–30 January 1984), a brief stop for fuel in Frederiksted, St. Croix, Virgin Islands, and another port visit on 18 February to Naval Station Roosevelt Roads, Puerto Rico. Klakring completed her Post Shakedown Availability at Bath (5 April–23 August). The yard work included the installation of fin stabilizers. The ship conducted her sea trials on 29 September, and on loaded weapons from Norfolk, Virginia, on 7 September. Hurricane Diana swept up the East Coast and delayed the frigate's return to Charleston from her scheduled date of 11 to 16 September. The ship completed a variety of training during the succeeding weeks, and escorted the aircraft carrier  during mid November.

1985
Klakring sailed for nearly five weeks of refresher training off Guantánamo Bay on 14 January 1985. On 21 February, Helicopter Antisubmarine Squadron (Light—HSL-42) Detachment 3, equipped with a single Sikorsky SH-60B Seahawk Light Airborne Multi-Purpose System (LAMPS) Mk III, embarked on board Klakring. The ship began participation in her first major fleet exercise, Composite Unit Training Exercise (COMTUEX) 2-85, on 22 April 1985. She broke up the training with a three-day visit to Frederiksted, U.S. Virgin Islands, and returned to Charleston on 8 May.

The destroyer  and Klakring sailed as MEF 3-85 Transit Group for the Middle East Force on 7 June 1985. This cruise marked the frigate's first overseas deployment. Comdr. Whalig served as the group's officer in tactical command (OTC). The two ships fueled and provisioned at Ponta Delgada, Azores, on 13 June, entered the United States Sixth Fleet, and stopped for additional fuel and supplies at Rota, Spain, on 16 June. Klakring visited Palma de Mallorca, Spain (18–21 June). The ship then crossed the Mediterranean by easterly courses.

Klakring passed southbound through the Suez Canal on 25 and 26 June 1985. As the ship crossed the Red Sea, she began to observe the weekends on Thursdays and Fridays to assimilate crewmen to Muslim daily routines. Klakring fueled and provisioned at Djibouti, Horn of Africa, on 30 June. On 1 July, she rendezvoused with guided missile destroyer  and exchanged information and equipment. Whalig became Commander Task Unit (CTU) 109.1.2, and oversaw the scheduling of all multi-ship training in the Persian Gulf. Klakring sailed through the Strait of Hormuz, and on 7 July rendezvoused with command ship  near Abu Dhabi, United Arab Emirates (UAE). The frigate escorted the flagship to Sitrah, Bahrain.

During the ship's first two months in the Persian Gulf, visibility averaged barely  because of haze, sand, and dust. The frigate's Seahawk flew an average of two sorties per day, and the crew reported that the presence of the strong temperature inversion made radar ranges of 160 nautical miles at altitudes below  common, which extended the helo's patrol coverage of the region.

The ship next visited Al Jubayl, Saudi Arabia (14–17 July 1985), briefly patrolled the Persian Gulf, and then completed upkeep at Mina Salman, Bahrain (22–31 July). On 6 August, Klakring escorted La Salle, and fueled and provisioned at Sitrah on 20 August. The frigate sailed from the Persian Gulf, and (25–28 August) visited Karachi, Pakistan. She passed through the Strait of Hormuz into the Persian Gulf on 31 August, and completed an additional upkeep at Dubai, UAE (3–10 September). The ship anchored at Sitrah for a Combat Systems Groom (13–15 September). On 20 September, she sailed from the Persian Gulf and trained with the Indian Ocean Battle Group, focusing on aircraft carrier operations, anti-air warfare, underway replenishment, and antisubmarine warfare. Klakring returned to the Persian Gulf on 24 September, training along the way with French aviso Quartier-Maître Anquetil.

After topping off her fuel and provisions on 26 October 1985, Klakring made for Ash Shuaibah, Kuwait, as the flagship for Commander Middle East Force. The ship patrolled the Persian Gulf, and completed upkeep at Mina Salman (30 October–4 November). The guided missile frigate  relieved Klakring in the Persian Gulf on 6 and 7 November. On 9 November, Klakring rendezvoused with Comte de Grasse and the two ships formed a transit group back to the United States. Comdr. Wahlig again served as OTC for the group.

Klakring fueled and provisioned at Djibouti on 11 November 1985, and continued northward across the Red Sea, returning to the standard workweek when she reached the southern entrance to the Suez Canal on 15 November. The following day, both ships transited the canal northbound, and visited Málaga, Spain (20–23 November). On 24 November, Klakring fueled and provisioned at Rota on 24 November, and that same afternoon entered the Second Fleet. The frigate celebrated Thanksgiving in Ponta Delgada, and returned to Charleston on 6 December 1985. On 12 December, Comdr. James M. Coon relieved Comdr. Wahlig as the commanding officer.

1986
The ship accomplished Combined at Sea Operations (CASTOPS) 2-86 (3–15 February 1986), including a visit to Nassau in the Bahamas (8–11 February). Klakring underwent an Operational Propulsion Plant Examination (OPPE) from 26 to 28 April, 1 and 2 May, and 29 and 30 May. The ship visited Savannah, Georgia, on 27 and 28 June. Klakring trained with Nimitz from 8 to 17 July 1986, including a visit to Port Everglades (11–14 July). On 31 July and 1 August, the ship conducted special projects for the Chief of Naval Operations (CNO).

Following her CNO project and a visit to Dodge Island Terminal, Miami, Florida (8–10 September) Klakring held a Tiger Cruise for her crew's dependents, on 11 September 1986. While the ship sailed to the operating area, she received a distress call from King Fisher II, a small fishing boat from Charleston. Klakring proceeded at full speed to King Fisher II, and the ship transferred her emergency party via small boat to render assistance. The frigate returned to port on 12 September. On 29 September she off loaded her weapons at the Naval Weapons Station Charleston, and completed her first Selective Restricted Availability (SRA-1) from 30 September to 5 December. On 12 December, Klakring on loaded her weapons from the Naval Weapons Station, and carried out her sea trials (15–18 December).

1987

Klakring completed a number of training exercises during the New Year, including Fleet Exercise (FLEETEX) 1-87 and a War at Sea scenario (10–27 February 1987), and Solid Shield 87, FLEETEX 2-87, and another War at Sea scenario from 30 April to 10 May. Klakring deployed from Charleston for the Middle East on 6 June 1987. On 8 June she rendezvoused with the other ships of her transit group, and refueled at Rota on 15 June. The frigate visited Taormina, Sicily (19–21 June). She passed through the Suez Canal into the Red Sea on 24 June, and on 29 June refueled at Djibouti.

The ship supported Operation Earnest Will. The Iranians and Iraqis escalated their attacks against ships sailing in the Persian Gulf during the Iran–Iraq War, and the U.S. launched Earnest Will to maintain freedom of navigation in the area. The Americans initially renamed and reflagged eleven Kuwaiti tankers. Klakring patrolled the Persian Gulf between Radar Picket Stations North and South. The ship repeatedly passed outbound through the Strait of Hormuz to refuel from underway replenishment ships, and then returned to the Persian Gulf. On 10 August, Klakring embarked a detachment of Army helicopters and helped coordinate the efforts of British tugs converted for mine sweeping. Klakring escorted —reflagged tanker Al Rekkah—outbound through the Strait of Hormuz on 30 August. The Iranians mined Bridgeton on 24 July, but the tanker survived.

The frigate rendezvoused with cargo ship  and steamship President Pierce and escorted them to Fujairah (2 and 3 September 1987). On 3 September, she escorted tanker  to Bahrain. Klakring escorted tanker  through the Strait of Hormuz on 1 October. Klakring passed outbound through the Strait of Hormuz and anchored at Fujairah on 24 October. The guided missile frigate  relieved Klakring on 26 October. The frigate refueled at Djibouti on 29 October, visited Jeddah, Saudi Arabia (1–4 November), passed northbound through the Suez Canal on 7 November, and (12–16 November) visited Saint Raphael, France. The ship put into Palma de Mallorca (17–21 November), on 22 November refueled at Rota, refueled again at Ponta Delgada on 26 November, and returned to Charleston on 4 December.

Klakring participated in Operation Earnest Will in the Persian Gulf in 1987 as the first air-capable, air-embarked ship. The frigate participated in Operation Prime Chance in the Persian Gulf during the "Tanker War".

1988
CMDR Dennis J. Van Buskirk relieved CMDR Coon as the commanding officer on 22 January 1988. Klakring completed repairs in drydock at Jacksonville Shipyards, Florida (1–22 February). The ship accomplished Interim Readiness Training with Task Group (TG) 43.2 at Guantánamo Bay (21 March–13 April). A variety of training exercises followed, broken by a visit to Ft. Lauderdale, Florida (8–13 May). She carried out further training, refueled at Roosevelt Roads on 18 May, visited St. Thomas (18–21 May), and on 27 May returned to Charleston. Klakring loaded a Coast Guard Rigid Inflatable Boat in preparation for her Caribbean Law Enforcement Operations (CDOPs) on 13 June 1988, setting sail the following day. The ship embarked a helicopter detachment at Mayport, Florida, on 18 June, and the following day the remaining Coast Guardsmen and their equipment boarded at Miami. Klakring participated in CDOPs (22 June–8 July), and returned to Charleston on 13 July.

On 19 October, Klakring and De Wert anchored off Vieques Island, Puerto Rico, for drills with a Navy Sea, Air, Land (SEAL) Team. Klakring also conducted flight operations with Army helicopters on 27 October.

1989
Klakring began her duties as host ship for the West German frigate  on 14 March 1989.

Klakring took part in FLEETEX 3-89 (13–28 April).

Klakring deployed as part of MED 3-89 on 31 May 1989.

While Klakring passed through the Strait of Gibraltar at 0400 on 11 June, she launched her helo in 44 knot winds. The ship relieved Charles F. Adams on 14 June. In company with San Jacinto she passed northbound through the Dardanelles and Bosporus on 18 June, and visited Constanta, Romania (19–22 June). Comdr. Van Buskirk and Capt. H. Ward Clark, the Commanding Office of San Jacinto, were flown to Bucharest to meet with Romanian defense leaders.

Klakring returned through the Bosporus and anchored at Istanbul, Turkey, on 23 June. On 27 June, she sailed southbound through the Dardanelles, and completed an intermediate maintenance availability with Haifa Shipyard, Ltd., Haifa, Israel, from 30 June to 10 July. Following her maintenance, she took part in Noble Dina 3, a joint US-Israeli naval exercise (10–13 July). She visited Alexandria, Egypt (19–24 July), and returned to Haifa (28–31 July). Rear Adm. Richard C. Macke, Commander Carrier Group 2, boarded the ship before her departure.

The frigate set a course for Palma, Spain, but on 1 August 1989, Arab terrorists in Beirut hanged Lt. Col. William R. Higgins, USMC, a member of the UN peacekeeping forces in Lebanon, and threatened to murder additional hostages they held. Klakring steamed to Alexandria, where Admiral Macke boarded Coral Sea, and the carrier made for the Eastern Mediterranean as a show of force. Klakring spent August off the Lebanese coast on contingency operations.

Mississippi, Kauffman, and Klakring visited Marseille, France (4–13 September 1989). Klakring participated in Display Determination, a multi-national exercise involving U.S., Italian, Spanish, and Turkish forces, across the Mediterranean and Aegean Seas (13 September–2 October). During the exercise, Klakring received word that Hurricane Hugo devastated Charleston. The Wives Support Group and the ship's Ombudsman, Janice Moore, confirmed that none of the crewmen's dependents sustained serious injuries. The ship took part in the 39th activation of Naval on Call Forces, Mediterranean, at Ancona, Italy (9–14 October 1989), and in the seaward exercise of the commemoration, Deterrent Force 2-89 (14–19 October). The exercise concluded with a briefing in Augusta Bay, Sicily. The frigate  relieved Klakring at Alicante, Spain, on 27 October. Three days later, Klakring put to sea and on 10 November she returned to Charleston.

1990s

1990
Klakring began 1990 in Port of Charleston, South Carolina, after returning from a Mediterranean cruise in November.

In January, Klakring spent most of her time in the Charleston and Jacksonville OPAREA's conducting exercises. After completing a combat Systems Assessment on 10 January, the ship arrived in Port Everglades, Florida on 13 January for a five-day port visit. While transiting back to Charleston, the ship encountered extremely rough weather with high winds and heavy seas. The Commanding Officer made the decision to enter port at night due to heavy weather, and the crew successfully conducted a difficult navigation detail in the Cooper River and returned Klakring to homeport during the stormy night.

The last two weeks of February were spent preparing for Type Commander's Core Training (TCCT) 2-90 and conducting deck landing qualifications with Helicopter Anti-Submarine Light FORTY SIX in the Jacksonville OPAREA. On 22 February, the ship rendezvoused with the frigate  and submarine  just east of the Bahamas. Klakring arrived in Roosevelt Roads, Puerto Rico on 26 February, onloaded exercise torpedoes, and was underway to the Puerto Rico OPAREA to begin TCCT 2-90.

During TCCT 2-90, the ship participated in numerous tracking and gunnery exercises, underway refuelings, highline transfers, and anti-submarine warfare evolutions. In addition, Klakring was selected to conduct two live missile firings along with the cruiser . Only one of the two missiles engaged the target due to a missile failure on the first missile fired. The event was significant in providing critical data needed in the performance evaluation of one of the Navy's primary weapons.

The month of March consisted of an Operational Propulsion Plant Examination (OPPE) and a Change of Command Ceremony. The two-day engineering inspection was completed on 23 March. On 30 March, CDR Larry J. Carter relieved CDR Dennis J. Van Buskirk as the fourth Commanding Officer of the frigate.

On 5 April, the ship began its preliminary preparations for its scheduled Dry-Docking Selective Restricted Availability (DSRA) with an offload of ammunition and weapons at the Charleston Naval Weapons Station. Klakrings non-essential ammunition being transferred to the frigate .

On 14 May, the ship was underway en route to Mayport Naval Station, Florida to make final preparations to enter the shipyard. All hands participated in an Integrated Logistics Overhaul offload of all shipboard parts and supplies completed on 16 May, and on 23 May, Klakring was dry-docked at Atlantic Dry Dock facility to begin the DSRA. The entire crew was moved into the Jacksonville Airport Days Inn Motel and would reside there for a period of 74 days.

In early August, the crew moved out of the Days Inn Motel and returned to shipboard living. On 27 August, installation of the SQR-19 Tactical Towed Array Sonar System began.

Klakring started the month of September preparing for the most important of a continued series of inspections: the Propulsion Examination Board Light-Off Examination (LOE). LOE commenced on 10 September and on 12 September she was "certified to steam." The end of the overhaul period was drawing near, and on 14 September the ship was underway for the final phase: the post-DSRA sea trials. All systems proved reliable and Klakring was delivered on 17 September, thirty-one days ahead of schedule and under budget. The ship would remain at the Mayport Naval Station for another month.

On 25 October, the ship got underway from Mayport and arrived at homeport Charleston one day later. Upon arrival, there was a Welcome Home Party held on board for all the families and friends of the crew.

Klakring was scheduled to participate in Caribbean Law Enforcement Operations in November, but a post overhaul hull inspection brought about a change in plans. After careful examination of videos of an underwater hull inspect:ion, it was determined that the ship's hull would have to be repainted. Klakring was dry-docked from 7–21 November at the Charleston Naval Shipyard to undergo the necessary repairs. The ship successfully received full aviation certification on 27 November, and began final preparations for a Harpoon Missile Tactical Qualification.

On 5 December, the ship was underway to embark HSL-48's Lamps MK III crew to participate in Destroyer Squadron Six "Operation Greyhound" for two days, fine tuning the skills of ship maneuvering and communications. In addition, Klakring turned north on 7 December en route to the Boston OPAREA to conduct at sea evaluations of the Navy's new Mk 50 Torpedo. Assisting aircraft were able to fire weapons, but continuously adverse weather conditions prevented Klakring and HSL-48 from doing so. The ship returned to Charleston on 19 December and began another extensive inspection the following day. The ship's Training Readiness Evaluation was completed on 21 December and the holiday stand down period began with a children's Christmas party held on board.

USS Klakring ended 1990 in port at Charleston.

1991
November, the day after Thanksgiving, the ship went underway for a six-month cruise to the Persian Gulf for Operation Desert Shield. The ship conducted exercises in the Mediterranean with an eight-day stop in Haifa, Israel, before entering the Suez Canal.

2000s
From August to November 2000, USS Klakring (FFG-42) participated in UNITAS 41, conducting exercises with Latin American partner navies and circumnavigating South America.

2010s

From 2001, Klakring was homeported at NAVSTA Mayport, Florida, and was part of Destroyer Squadron 14. In March 2008 and 2009, the ship was the subject of protests from pro-Russian activists in Sevastopol, Ukraine, when it visited the port for five-day "friendly" visits.

Klakring was decommissioned on 22 March 2013.

Awards

References 

 (1982-1990)
 (1991-1994)
 (1995-2003)
 (2004-2013)

External links 

 

 USS Klakring at navysite.de
USS Klakring FFG-42 pages at MaritimeQuest
USS Klakring command histories at the Naval History & Heritage Command

1982 ships
Oliver Hazard Perry-class frigates of the United States Navy
Ships built in Bath, Maine
Cold War frigates and destroyer escorts of the United States